GA²LEN, or Global Allergy and Asthma European Network, is a consortium of leading European research centres specialized in allergic diseases, which include asthma. Funded by the European Union under the 6th Framework Programme, GA²LEN addresses the growing public health concern of allergic diseases.

Research teams were chosen for their scientific excellence, their record on multidisciplinary working and international collaboration, and their educational activities. Since the launch of the Network, it has grown to include an additional 50 collaborating centres making GA²LEN one of the largest multidisciplinary networks of researchers in allergy and asthma worldwide.

Integrating European research 

Europe has produced some of the most important recent findings on allergy and asthma, but research tends to be fragmented in different institutes and even in different departments of the same organization. Findings are not always shared nor rapidly translated into changes in practice. The GA²LEN Network of Excellence (NoE) exists to help integrate research activities in Europe and to establish the structure for a European Research Area of excellence in allergy and asthma that will endure.

Spreading knowledge and excellence 

The network aims to accelerate the application of research results into clinical practice, to meet the needs of patients, and to help guide policy development. It also aims to promote training and greater integration between public and private sectors in this medical field.

By addressing allergy and asthma in their totality, GA²LEN's ultimate objective is to benefit the well-being of patients by decreasing the burden of allergic diseases in Europe.

Personnel
 Professor Paul van Cauwenberge, University of Ghent, - GA²LEN Co-ordinator
 Professor Torsten Zuberbier - GA²LEN President

GA²LEN Publications and Journals

References

External links 
  www.ga2len.net Global Allergy and Asthma European Network
 European Centre for Allergy Research Foundation - Partner of GA²LEN

Allergy organizations
European medical and health organizations